Christopher R. Perone is a five-term Democratic member of the Connecticut House of Representatives, representing the 137th District since 2005. He previously served as a member of the Norwalk Common Council from 2001 to 2003. He is a graduate of Syracuse University with a degree in advertising.

Early life and family 
Perone was born in Bedford, New York and attended Fox Lane High School.

Political career 
Perone was elected to the Norwalk Common Council from District D. He has served on the board of the Southwestern Regional Planning Association, (S.W.R.P.A.) and on the committees of several groups including the Norwalk Education Foundation, the Lockwood Matthew’s Mansion restoration committee and the Norwalk Land Trust.

Perone was elected to Connecticut House of Representatives representing the 137th District in 2004. He has been re-elected 2006, 2008, 2010, and 2012. In 2012, he defeated Republican challenger Joanne T. Romano in the race for the 137th District seat.

Perone is current the chair of the Commerce Committee.

External links 
 Office website

References 

Connecticut city council members
Democratic Party members of the Connecticut House of Representatives
People from Bedford, New York
Politicians from Norwalk, Connecticut
Syracuse University alumni
Living people
21st-century American politicians
Year of birth missing (living people)